= Biochemical Genetics (journal) =

Bimonthly peer-reviewed scientific journal

- Discipline: Biochemistry; Genetics
- Language: English
- Edited by: Stefano Cagnin (Padova, Italy), Nejat Dalay (Istanbul, Turkey), Veronica Lia (Buenos Aires, Argentina)

Publication details
- History: 1967–present
- Publisher: Springer Science+Business Media
- Frequency: Bimonthly
- Impact factor: 1.9 (2025)

Standard abbreviations
- ISO 4: Biochem. Genet.

Indexing
- CODEN: BIGEBA
- ISSN: 0006-2928 (print); 1573-4927 (web)
- LCCN: 73012779
- OCLC no.: 299333369

Links
- Journal homepage; Online archive

Biochemical Genetics is a bimonthly peer-reviewed scientific journal covering molecular biology as it relates to genetics. It was established in 1967 and is published by Springer Science+Business Media. According to the Journal Citation Reports, the journal has a 2025 impact factor of 1.9.

== Abstracting and indexing ==
The journal is abstracted and indexed in major bibliographic databases, including Science Citation Index Expanded, Journal Citation Reports, MEDLINE/PubMed, Scopus, EMBASE, BIOSIS Previews, Chemical Abstracts Service (CAS), and Current Contents/Life Sciences.
